The Deutsche Zeitung Bessarabiens (German Newspaper of Bessarabia) was a German language newspaper in Bessarabia (today: Ukraine), founded in 1919.

References

Bessarabia
Defunct newspapers published in Ukraine
German-language newspapers published in Europe
Newspapers established in 1919
Publications disestablished in 1940